Alberto Gómez Fernández (born 27 December 1980), known as Nagore, is a Spanish former professional footballer who played as a right-back.

Club career
Born in Madrid, Nagore spent until the age of nearly 30 in lower league football, rarely settling with a team as he only played more than one year with Alicante CF. In the 2009–10 season he contributed 38 games and one goal – playoffs included – as AD Alcorcón promoted to Segunda División for the first time in its history.

In the 2012–13 campaign Nagore, still an undisputed starter for the Community of Madrid side, only missed three matches in the regular season, totalled nearly 3,500 minutes of action and added four goals as they nearly achieved another promotion via the playoffs. Previously, on 30 June 2012, he renewed his contract for one year.

Nagore first reached La Liga aged 33, signing on 7 January 2014 for six months with Levante UD as a replacement for the departed Christian Lell. He made his debut two days later, playing the second half of a 0–0 away draw against Rayo Vallecano in the round of 16 of the Copa del Rey.

Nagore made his first appearance in the Spanish top flight on 9 February 2014, replacing injured Nikos Karabelas in the first half of an eventual 0–0 draw at Real Sociedad. Following his short spell he returned to his previous club, signing a two-year deal on 10 July 2014.

References

External links

1980 births
Living people
Footballers from Madrid
Spanish footballers
Association football defenders
La Liga players
Segunda División players
Segunda División B players
Tercera División players
Rayo Vallecano B players
CF Gimnástico Alcázar players
CD Logroñés footballers
CD Toledo players
Alicante CF footballers
Girona FC players
Lorca Deportiva CF footballers
AD Alcorcón footballers
Levante UD footballers
SD Huesca footballers